The 46th International Antalya Golden Orange Film Festival was a film festival held in   Antalya, Turkey which ran from 19 to 17 October 2009.

This edition of the International Antalya Golden Orange Film Festival was the first to be organised solely by the Antalya Foundation for Culture and Arts (AKSAV), a cultural body affiliated with the Antalya Greater Municipality, and the first to have an international section within the main body of the festival.

Awards

National Feature Competition 
 Best Film: Bornova Bornova directed by İnan Temelkuran and Cosmos directed by Reha Erdem
 Best First Film: On the Way to School directed by Orhan Eskiköy and Özgür Doğan
 Best Director: Reha Erdem for Cosmos
 Best Screenplay: Onur Ünlü for Five Cities
 Best Actress: Nergis Öztürk  for Envy
 Best Actor: Öner Erkan for Bornova Bornova
 Best Cinematographer: Florent Herry for Cosmos 
 Best Music Score: Mehmet Erdem and Özgür Akgül for Piano Girl
 Best Supporting Actress: Damla Sönmez for Bornova Bornova
 Best Supporting Actor: Volga Sorgu for Black Dogs Barking
 Best Film Editor: Erkan Tekemen for Bornova Bornova
 Best Art Director: Zeynep Koloğlu for The Master
 Behlül Dal Jury Special Award: Bahadır Karataş for The Master, Evrim Alataş  for Min Dît: The Children of Diyarbakır  ( / ), Tansu Biçer for Five Cities and Emre Şahin for 40
 Dr. Avni Tolunay Special Jury Award for Best Picture: Cosmos directed by Reha Erdem

Golden orange
Golden Orange
Antalya Golden Orange Film Festival
Golden Orange Film Festival
21st century in Antalya